Awendo is a town in Migori County, Kenya;also known as Sare Awendo.

Sport
 Green Stadium, a multi-purpose stadium with a capacity of 5,000 people, is located in Awendo. 
 Sony Sugar, an association football club plays its home games at the stadium.

References

Migori County
Populated places in Nyanza Province